The Shediac/Cap-Pele Predators are a Junior ice hockey team from Shediac, Scoudouc, Grand-Barachois and Cap-Pelé in New Brunswick, Canada.  The Predators play in the New Brunswick Junior C Hockey League.

History
The team was founded in 2000.  The Predators were Maritime-North Junior Hockey Champions in 2006, 2007, and 2008 by winning the Maritime-Hockey North Junior C Championships.

External links
Predators Homepage

Ice hockey teams in New Brunswick
Shediac
2000 establishments in New Brunswick
Ice hockey clubs established in 2000